Grady Gene Richardson (born April 2, 1952) is a former American football tight end in the National Football League for the Washington Redskins. He played college football at California State University, Fullerton.

References 

1952 births
Living people
American football tight ends
Cal State Fullerton Titans football players
Washington Redskins players
People from Houston